This is a discography for Joe Dassin.

Joe Dassin, nicknamed the most French of the Americans, was born in New York in 1938 and died in 1980 of a heart attack in Papeete (Tahiti in French Polynesia). He is the son of the American film director Jules Dassin.

During his career he recorded about 250 songs and sold more than 50 million albums throughout the world.

For the list of Joe Dassin's songs, consult this article.

French discography

Studio albums

EPs

Singles

Compilation albums

German discography

Studio albums 
{| class="wikitable" 
!align="left" valign="top" width="40"|Year
!align="left" valign="top" width="350"|Album
!align="center" valign="top" width="70"|Label
!align="left" valign="top" width="130"|Notes
|-
|align="left" valign="top"|1972
|align="left" valign="top"|Das sind zwei linke Schuh'''
|align="center" valign="top"|CBS
|align="center" valign="top"|Reissued in 1972, CBS/Embassy.
|-
|align="left" valign="top"|1972
|align="left" valign="top"|Ich hab mich verliebt|align="center" valign="top"|CBS
|align="center" valign="top"|
|}

 Singles 

 Compilations 

 English Discography 

 Studio albums 

 Singles 

 Spanish Discography 

 Singles 

 Studio albums 

 Compilations 

 Greek Discography 

 Singles 

 Italian Discography 

 Singles 

 Japanese Discography 

 Singles 

 Live albums 

 Other Compilations (CD) 

Collaborations and other appearances

Video albums

Video
 1989 Ses plus grands succès 1998 Le dernier slow 2000 De l'Amérique aux Champs-Élysées DVD 
 2000 Ses plus grands succès 
 2005 À toi...'' (Live at the Olympia 1977, different than the version on Musicorama III)

Discography and Songs Catalog 
 French Discography
 International Catalog of all recordings available

References 
 "Biography - Joe Dassin". Rfimusique.com
 "Discography - Joe Dassin". Music-story.com

Notes

Discographies of French artists
Pop music discographies